Anne Goursaud is a French filmmaker known for her work editing Francis Ford Coppola films like Bram Stoker's Dracula and The Outsiders. She has also directed Poison Ivy II and Embrace of the Vampire.

Selected filmography 
As director:

 A Classy Broad (2016)
 Love in Paris (1997)
 Poison Ivy II: Lily (1996)
 Embrace of the Vampire (1995)

As editor:

 The Maestro (2018)
 A Classy Broad (2016)
 Days of Wrath (2008)
 Dark Streets (2008)
 Expired (2007)
 Idlewild (2006)
 Who Never Lived (2006)
 Quattro Noza (2003)
 Lost Souls (2000)
 San Tiao Ren (1999)
 Love in Paris (1997)
 Wide Sargasso Sea (1993)
 Bram Stoker's Dracula (1992)
 The Two Jakes (1990)
 Her Alibi (1989)
 Ironweed (1987)
 Crimes of the Heart (1986)
 Just Between Friends (1986)
 American Dreamer (1984)
 The Outsiders (1983)
 One from the Heart (1982)
 The Night the Lights Went Out in Georgia (1981)
 A Great Bunch of Girls (1979)
 A Force of One (1979)

References 

Living people
French women film editors
French film editors
French film directors
French women film directors
1943 births